Adduction is an anatomical term of motion referring to a movement which brings a part of the anatomy closer to the middle sagittal plane of the body.

Upper limb

Arm and shoulder
 of arm at shoulder (lowering arm)
Subscapularis
 Teres major
 Pectoralis major
 Infraspinatus
 Triceps brachii (long head)
 Latissimus dorsi
 Coracobrachialis

Hand and wrist
 of hand at wrist
 Flexor carpi ulnaris
 Extensor carpi ulnaris
 of fingers
 Palmar interossei
 of thumb
 Adductor pollicis

Lower limb
 of thigh at hip
 medial compartment of thigh/adductor muscles of the hip
 Adductor longus
 Adductor brevis
 Adductor magnus
 Pectineus
 Gracilis

Foot and toes
 of toes (S2-S3)
 Adductor hallucis
 Plantar interossei

Other
 eyeball
 Superior rectus muscle
 Inferior rectus muscle
 Medial rectus muscle
 jaw (muscles of mastication, the closing of the jaw is adduction):
 masseter
 pterygoid muscles (lateral and medial)
 temporalis
 vocal folds
 Lateral cricoarytenoid muscle

References

See also

Anatomical terms of motion